Holos Krainy (in Ukrainian Голос країни; meaning The Voice of the Country) is a Ukrainian reality talent show that premiered on the 1+1 network on 22 May 2011. Holos Krainy is part of the international syndication The Voice based on the reality singing competition launched in the Netherlands as The Voice of Holland, created by Dutch television producer John de Mol. It was the second international adaptation of the programme, after the American version.
There is also a children version of the same show, Holos. Dity.

Format 
The Voice is a reality television series that features four coaches looking for a talented new artist, who could become a global superstar. The show's concept is indicated by its title: the coaches do not judge the artists by their looks, personalities, stage presence, or dance routines—only their vocal ability. It is this aspect that differentiates The Voice from other reality television series such as The X Factor, and Ukraine's Got Talent. The competitors are split into four teams, which are mentored by the coaches who in turn choose songs for their artists to perform. There is no specific age range and anyone can audition; if a coach likes what they hear, a button press allows their chair to spin around and face the performer, signifying that they would like to mentor them. If more than one does so, then the artist selects a coach. However, if no coach turns around then the artist is sent home.

There are five different stages: producers' auditions, Blind auditions, Battle phase, Knockout stage, and live shows.

After preliminary casting, which is directed by the show's music producer, the selected contestants advance to the next round - the "Blind Auditions". As part of the "blind auditions", four mentors select participants for their team without seeing them, sitting with their backs to the stage and hearing only their voices. If an artist's vocal impresses one of the coaches, while the music is playing, he turns his chair towards the stage. If one coach turns to the vocalist, then the participant automatically becomes part of his/her team, if there are several, the participant chooses which team to join.

As a result of this stage, 14 participants are recruited in each of the teams (56 participants in total). Starting with season 7, each coach recruits 16 participants to his/her team. In season 8, the rules change: a participant who has not deployed a single chair immediately leaves the stage, but in the ninth, this is canceled. In season 9, a "block" is introduced: a coach has the right to "block" one of the other coaches once in the entire duration of the blind auditions, that is, to prevent one coach from getting an artist into his/her team. Starting from season 11, the block button was removed.

The coach divides 14 members of his team into 7 duets, which will fight for further participation in the show. He provides each duet with a composition for performance, which will be performed in a special "vocal ring". After the duo's performance, each coach listens to the opinions of other mentors and chooses the winner of the battle. The loser is eliminated from the show. Starting from season 3, coaches have the opportunity to "steal" one participant from another team who lost a battle, saving him from being kicked out of the show.

From season 7, a new rule is added - the steal room. This was first adopted in the seventh season of The Voice of Holland. If the mentor "stole" one of the participants, then he goes to a special room, in which he sits on a chair corresponding to the mentor who "stole" him. If then the same mentor saves another participant, then the one currently seated gives him a seat on the chair and is eventually eliminated. At the end of this stage, each of the teams, starting from season 3, remains 8 participants - seven point winners and one rescued participant from the other team (32 participants in total). In seasons 1 and 2, 7 participants remained in the teams. From season 7, 9 members remain.

In season 3, a new stage appeared - "Super Battles" ("Knockouts"). The participants who remained after the vocal battles are distributed by the mentor into pairs (4 pairs from each team). At this stage, the participants themselves choose the compositions with which they will fight for participation in live broadcasts. Also, in each pair, the participants perform separately, in turn. In each knockout, the mentor determines the winner - the artist who will perform live - and the loser - the participant who will leave the show. 

Starting from season 6, the trainer does not divide the participants into pairs, but “chairs” are introduced. After the participant's performance, the mentor either offers to give the artist a chair or immediately sends him home. Only half - the best 16 - go to the next stage. Starting from season 10, each mentor has the opportunity to "steal" one member from the other team, whom the mentor sent to the "spare lava". The top 20 go to the next stage. In season 11, one eliminated artist from each team will be saved by public voting.

On live broadcasts, the participants perform solo. The further participation of artists in the project is decided by viewers by SMS voting. The participant with the largest number of audience votes in each team automatically goes to the next round, and the coach selects one of the remaining 3 or 4 participants in the project. In the Semi-final of the project, the participants who will go further are determined by the sum of points from the audience (as a percentage of votes per team) and a mentor (who distributes 100% between their wards). Each team in the Superfinal is represented by one participant. The final voting takes place in three rounds, in each of which one participant is eliminated. Votes are canceled after each round. The participant who takes first place in the final vote becomes the winner of the show.

The winner receives a contract with the record company Universal Music. Since the seventh season, the rules have changed. Now the winner of the show gets an apartment in Kyiv.

Coaches and finalists 
 – Winning coach and contestant
 – Runner-up coach and contestant
 – Third place coach and contestant
 – Fourth place coach and contestant

 Winners are in bold, finalists in the finale are listed first and eliminated artists are in small font.

Series overview
Warning: the following table presents a significant amount of different colors.

Coaches and presenters

Coaches

Coaches' timeline

 Legend
 Featured as a full-time coach.
 Featured as a coach's advisor.

Presenters

Season synopses

Season 1

Elimination Chart 
 Color Key
  Team Alexander
  Team Diana
  Team Ruslana
  Team Stas
  Artist was saved by the public
  Artist was saved by the coach
  Artist advanced to the finals
  Artist was eliminated

Season 7

Elimination Chart
 Color Key
  Team Karol
  Team Babkin
  Team Potap
  Team Jamala
  Artist was saved by the public
  Artist was saved by the coach
  Artist advanced to the finals
  Artist was eliminated

Semifinal

Final

Season 8

Elimination Chart
 Color Key
  Team Karol
  Team Babkin
  Team Potap
  Team Jamala
  Artist was saved by the public
  Artist was saved by the coach
  Artist advanced to the finals
  Artist was eliminated

Semifinal

Final

Season 9

Elimination Chart
 Color Key
  Team Tina
  Team Dan
  Team Potap
  Team MONATIK
  Artist was saved by the public
  Artist was saved by the coach
  Artist advanced to the finals
  Artist was eliminated

Semifinal

Final

Notes

References

 
Ukrainian reality television series
1+1 (TV channel) original programming
2011 Ukrainian television series debuts